Randy the Band is an album by Swedish punk rock band Randy, released in October 2005 by Ny Våg Records and Epitaph Records/Burning Heart Records. As of July 2020, it is Randy's latest album.

The album produced one single, "Razorblade," for which the band recorded a music video.

Critical reception 

In their review of the album, AllMusic called Randy "one of [Sweden]'s most highly touted punk bands" and positively likened the band to Green Day in saying that both groups are "ferociously energetic." The review also complimented Randy for "maintaining a knife-edge balance between youthful energy and tightly played rock & roll." While AllMusic did not give the album a formal rating or distinguish any tracks as highlights or standouts, the review itself individually praised the tracks "Punk Rock High," "Rich Boy," "Teenage Tiger," "I Raise My Fist," and "Losing My Mind."

PunkNews reviewer William David gave the album 8 out of 10 stars, remarking in their review, "Anyone who has followed the career of this band knows they have consistently delivered hit album after hit album, and [this album] is no exception." He complimented the band's style of "catchy-as-can-be rock n' roll" and noted that the band had "honed in on their melodic side this time around," differing from previous heavier and less melodic albums like Welfare Problems. David also compared the band's style in the album to The Clash, also complimenting the band for their guitar work, attention to melody, and socialist lyrical themes. David distinguished "Razorblade," "Evil," "The Pretender," and "Going Out With the Dead" as standout tracks.

Like AllMusic, Peter Gaston of Spin did not reward Randy the Band with a formal rating; however, in his review of the album, he praises the band's music for being "taut and loaded with punchy, fist-pumping choruses." He favorably compares the second track on the album, "Razorblade," to Social Distortion; he also favorably compares "Better than Art" to Andrew W.K.

Like AllMusic and Spin, Sam Sutherland with Exclaim! did not award Randy the Band with a formal rating. However, he complimented the evolution in sound evident in the album, as well as the band's influence from predecessors in the punk rock and rock n' roll scenes: "While the band aren't the type to boldly explore any new sonic territory, they still manage to spice up such tracks as 'Going Out with the Dead' with the full-on cheese factor of dueling guitar solos. 'Teenage Tiger' pays homage to Little Richard with its nonsensical lyrical styling, and 'Losing My Mind' calls up the filthy guitar solos of Greg Ginn and Dez Cadena." Sutherland compliments lead vocalist Stefan Granberg's performance on the album in particular. He notes that the politics in Randy the Band are more subdued than those in previous albums but still calls the album "a solid release from a generally consistent band."

Track listing

Information
 Recorded at Decibel Studios
 Recorded by Estudiomac
 Mixed at Sjöbjörn Studio
 Mastered at Cutting Room Studios
 Mixed and engineered by Pelle Gunnerfeldt
 All tracks produced by Randy
 Artwork by Robert Pettersson
 Design (Cover/Laser/Back/Label), Layout by Hugo Sundkvist
 Published by Warner/Chappell and Picnic Music
 Released by Burning Heart on October 10, 2005
 Distributed by Epitaph Records/Epitaph Europe
 Performed by Randy

Credits 
 Fredrik Granberg - drums
 Johan Gustafsson - bass, background vocals
 Stefan Granberg - vocals, guitar
 Johan Brändström - guitar, background vocals, some lead vocals
 Randy - Primary Artist, Producer

References

2005 albums
2005 in Swedish music
Randy (band) albums
New wave albums by Swedish artists
Burning Heart Records albums